Orozbekov is a village in Batken Region of Kyrgyzstan. It is part of the Kadamjay District. It has 7 main zones: Garaj, Kuldu, Boston, Zar, Joo-Kesek, Naiman and Uchkun. Its population was 3,503 in 2021. The village was named after politician Abdukadyr Urazbekov.

Nearby towns and villages include Kyzyl-Bulak and Kadamjay.

Population

References 

Populated places in Batken Region